Frank Tuttle (November 15, 1905 – August 6, 1969) was an American set decorator. He was nominated for three Academy Awards in the category Best Art Direction.

Selected filmography
Tuttle was nominated for three Academy Awards for Best Art Direction:
 A Thousand and One Nights (1945)
 King Rat (1965)
 Guess Who's Coming to Dinner (1967)

References

External links

American set decorators
1905 births
1969 deaths